The fifth season of The Voice Kids premiered on February 25, 2023 on Kapamilya Channel, A2Z, and TV5. Bamboo Mañalac reprised his role as a coach, being joined by debuting coaches KZ Tandingan and Martin Nievera.

This is  be the first season among the Philippine seasons to feature only one female coach, as well as the first to feature two new coaches. The fifth season is also the first among the kids' seasons to feature the block button, where a coach can prevent another coach from getting picked by a contestant.

Development
The renewal of The Voice Kids was announced on November 14, 2022; the schedule for the auditions were also announced. It was announced that this season will also air on TV5 during the 2023 trade launch of the said network on November 23, 2022.

Producers' auditions 
The auditions were opened to children aged 6–12. The producers' auditions were held in cities and municipalities throughout the Philippines.

Changes

Coaches and hosts

On December 18, 2022, the roster of coaches for the fifth season was announced on the Tayo ang Ligaya ng Isa't-Isa: The ABS-CBN Christmas Special 2022. Of the three coaches that appeared in the previous season, only Bamboo Mañalac returned, marking the exit of Lea Salonga and Sarah Geronimo from the judging panel. The two departing coaches were replaced by singer and rapper KZ Tandingan and singer and television host Martin Nievera.

Following the exit of Toni Gonzaga from the network, it was announced in the press that Bianca Gonzalez will take over her hosting duties, joined by Robi Domingo who has been a co-host of the show since its second season.

Companion show
The online companion show, titled The Voice Kids DigiTV will air together with the main program on the official Facebook and YouTube accounts of The Voice Kids. Jeremy Glinoga will return as the host, together with season 2 winner Elha Nympha, taking over KaladKaren.

Block button
As shown in the teasers, new to this season is the Block. Each coach may press the corresponding button to prevent one coach from getting an artist. This mechanic was first introduced in the Filipino franchise in 2020 during the second season of The Voice Teens.

Teams

Blind auditions

The season begins with the "Blind auditions" on February 25, 2023. In each audition, an auditionee performs their piece to the three coaches whose chairs are facing away from the stage and the artist. If the coach is interested in working with the artist, they can press the button to make themselves available for the artist to be chosen as their coach. If only one coach presses their button, the artist is defaulted to that coach's team; if multiple coaches presses their button, the coaches compete for the artist, with the artist choosing which team to join. Each coach is given one block to prevent a fellow coach from getting an artist. Each coach needs to recruit 18 young artists into their teams.

The coaches performed "Bawat Bata" by APO Hiking Society at the beginning of the pilot episode.

Episode 1 (February 25)

Episode 2 (February 26)

Episode 3 (March 4)

Episode 4 (March 5)

Episode 5 (March 11)

Episode 6 (March 12)

Episode 7 (March 18)

Episode 8 (March 19)

Notes

References

The Voice of the Philippines
The Voice Kids (Philippine TV series)
2023 Philippine television seasons